Spottswood is an unincorporated community in Augusta County, Virginia, United States. The James Alexander House and the Old Providence Stone Church, which are listed on the National Register of Historic Places, are both located near Spottswood.

References

Unincorporated communities in Augusta County, Virginia
Unincorporated communities in Virginia